The men's 10 m platform competition of the diving events at the 2012 European Aquatics Championships was held on May 20.

Medalists

Results
The preliminary round was held at 14:00 local time. The final was held at 19:30.

References 

2012 European Aquatics Championships